Stanbell was a  tanker which was built by Sir J Laing & Sons, Sunderland in 1943 as  Empire Beresford for the Ministry of War Transport. Postwar she was sold into merchant service and renamed Stanbell. She was converted to a bulk carrier and later sold to new owners and renamed Kelantan, serving until scrapped in 1965.

Description
Empire Beresford was built by Sir J Laing & Sons, Sunderland. She  was yard number 753 and was launched on 15 September 1943 with completion in December. Her GRT was 9,804, with a NRT of 5,793.

Career
Empire Beresford was placed under the management of J A Billmeir & Co Ltd, who traded as the Stanhope Steamship Co Ltd. Her port of registry was Sunderland. Empire Beresford was a member of a number of convoys during the Second World War.

HX 313
Convoy HX 313 departed New York on 10 October 1944 and arrived at Liverpool on 24 October. Empire Beresford was listed as a member of this convoy but did not sail in it, she joined the following convoy, HX 314.

HX 314
Convoy HX 314 departed New York on 15 October 1944 and arrived at Liverpool on 29 October. Empire Beresford was bound for Killingholme.

In 1945, Billmeir's purchased Empire Beresford from the MoWT and renamed her Stanbell. On 13 December 1953, Stanbell was in collision with SS Marine Courier off Cape Henry, Virginia. The master of Marine Courier was found to have been at fault and his licence was suspended for a month.

In 1955, Stanbell was converted to a bulk carrier. She was now ,  and 14,810 DWT. In 1960, Stanbell was sold to the Malaya Shipping Co Ltd, Hong Kong and renamed Kelantan. She was initially placed under the management of United Shipping & Investment Co Ltd, Hong Kong but management was later transferred to Gibson Shipping Co Inc, Macao. Kelantan was scrapped in March 1965 at Hirao, Japan.

Official Numbers and Code Letters

Official Numbers were a forerunner to IMO Numbers. Empire Beresford had the UK Official Number 180053 and the Code Letters GFMY.

Propulsion

It was built by North East Marine Engineering Co Ltd, Newcastle upon Tyne.

References

1943 ships
Ships built on the River Wear
Ministry of War Transport ships
Empire ships
World War II tankers
Steamships of the United Kingdom
Tankers of the United Kingdom
Maritime incidents in 1953
Steamships of Hong Kong
Tankers of Hong Kong